Mehboob Bawa (born 28 March 1968) is a South African actor, producer, singer, and MC. He is best known for producing and starring in the film Bhai's Cafe.

Personal life
Mehboob Bawa was born in Cape Town, South Africa. He completed a Television Presentation Course at SABC.

Career
In 1994, he appeared in the direct-to-video film The Visual Bible: Acts. Then in 1996, he made the feature film debut with the role "Taxi chaufför" in the film The White Lioness. Since then, he acted in the films such as; Mandela and de Klerk, Pirates of the Plain, Mama Jack and Supernova. Meanwhile, in 2000, he made television acting debut with the serial Madam & Eve. In 2007, he made the popular role "Ahmed Kathrada" in the Hollywood blockbuster award winning film Goodbye Bafana directed by Bille August.

In 2009, he appeared in the NBC American action drama television series The Philanthropist and then in the serial Final Verdict in 2011. Apart from acting, he started to produce the films especially Indian films shot in South Africa. He worked as the line producer of many blockbuster Bollywood films such as; Agent Vinod, Cocktail, Murder 3, Aashiqui 2, Khamoshiyan, Mr. X, Hamari Adhuri Kahani and Sanju. In 2016, he played the role of Dr. Khan in the serial Jab. In 2019 he produced the Bollywood style South African musical comedy-drama film Bhai's Cafe, where he played the titular role of Bhai. The premise was based on the cafe his family ran when he was growing up. Even though the film had a brief theatrical release in February 2020, the film became a Box Office when cinemas closed the following month after moved to DStv.

Filmography

Film

Television

References

External links
 

Living people
1968 births
Male actors from Cape Town
South African people of Indian descent
People from Cape Town
South African male film actors
South African singers
South African male television actors